Edwin Vásquez Cam (28 July 1922 – 9 March 1993) was an Olympic sport shooter from Peru. He won a gold medal in the 50 m pistol event at the 1948 Summer Olympics, his country's only Olympic gold medalist so far. Vásquez also won the free pistol event at the 1951 Pan American Games, while placing third in the team pistol event.

References

External links
Edwin Vásquez profile at Database Olympics

1922 births
1993 deaths
Peruvian male sport shooters
ISSF pistol shooters
Peruvian people of Chinese descent
Shooters at the 1948 Summer Olympics
Olympic shooters of Peru
Olympic gold medalists for Peru
Olympic medalists in shooting
Medalists at the 1948 Summer Olympics
Pan American Games gold medalists for Peru
Pan American Games bronze medalists for Peru
Pan American Games medalists in shooting
Shooters at the 1951 Pan American Games
Medalists at the 1951 Pan American Games
20th-century Peruvian people